Saepinum (modern Altilia, near Sepino) was a Samnite town located c.  south of the modern Campobasso in south central Italy. Saepinum was on the ancient road from Beneventum to Corfinium.

History
The position of the original town is on the mountain far above the Roman town, and remains of its walls in Cyclopean masonry still exist. It was captured by the Romans in 293 BC. The city walls (in opus reticulatum) of the Roman town were erected by Tiberius before he became emperor, and are dated to between 2 BC and 4 AD by an inscription. Within the city walls are remains of a theatre and other buildings, including temples of Jupiter and Apollo. There still exists, by the gate leading to Bovianum, an important inscription of about 168 AD, relating to the tratture (see Apulia) in Roman days, forbidding the natives to harm the shepherds who passed along them.

The presence of tombs from the 4th century within the city walls suggests that the city had been largely abandoned by that time.  Following the collapse of the Western Roman Empire, Saepinum was taken in 882 by Saracens.

References

External links
Jeff Matthews, Saepinum
Travel journal with images of Saepinum ruins
Michael Frank, "A Rarity Among Roman Towns," New York Times, December 23, 1990, web: NYT-60
 

Roman towns and cities in Italy
Archaeological sites in Molise
Former populated places in Italy
National museums of Italy
Basilicas in Italy